Minnesota State Highway 271 (MN 271) is a  highway in southwest Minnesota, which runs from its intersection with State Highway 19 in Hendricks Township and continues north and west to its terminus at the South Dakota state line, where the roadway becomes South Dakota Highway 28.

Route description
Highway 271 serves as a north–south route in southwest Minnesota between State Highway 19, the city of Hendricks, and the South Dakota state line near the towns of Astoria and Toronto.

Highway 271 is also known as Division Street in Hendricks.

Near its northern terminus, Highway 271 turns west, and the roadway becomes South Dakota Highway 28 upon crossing the state line.

The route is legally defined as Route 271 in the Minnesota Statutes.

History
Highway 271 was authorized on July 1, 1949.

The route was paved at the time it was marked except for the short east-west section, which was paved in the mid-1950s.

Major intersections

References

External links

Highway 271 at the Unofficial Minnesota Highways Page

271
Transportation in Lincoln County, Minnesota